The Broadcasting Act 1981 (c. 68) was an Act of the Parliament of the United Kingdom. The effect of the Act was to consolidate the previous Independent Broadcasting Acts 1973, 1974 and 1978 and the Broadcasting Act 1980. The Act was repealed by the Broadcasting Act 1990. It was under this Act (and the BBC Licence and Agreement) that the Sinn Féin broadcast ban from 1988 to 1994 was originally implemented.

References

External links
 Legislation link

United Kingdom Acts of Parliament 1981
1981 in British television
Media legislation
Censorship of broadcasting in the United Kingdom
History of mass media in the United Kingdom
Broadcasting in the United Kingdom